The following is a list of notable people from Brunswick, Victoria, Australia.

Sports

Australian Rules football

Henry Alder 
Rupert Balfe - also a soldier
Alex Barningham
Sam Barrett
Archie Baxter 
Norm Beckton 
Vic Belcher 
Billy Blackman
Jack Booth
Chic Breese
Phil Busbridge
Wally Carter
Tommy Cockram
Col Crawford
Claude Curtin 
Johnny Davies
Harold Day
Bill Denehy 
John Dowling 
Charlie Dummett
Fred Finch
John Fitzgerald
Doug Fraser 
Jack Green 
Don Grossman
Charlie Hackett
Bill Harris
George Hawkins
Doug Hill
Bill Heaphy
Frank Hughes Jr.
Alf Jackson - also military officer
Maurie Johnson
Fred Kennett
Jim Kettle
Ted Leehane
Tom Maguire
George Martin 
Aubrey Martyn 
Colin Martyn
Jack McKenzie
Sid Meehl
John Mitchell
Flurence Moore
Georgia Nanscawen - also a hockey player
Alan Nutter
Mick O'Loughlin
Les Oliver
Norm Oliver
Tom Pettit
Henry Powell
Les Powell
Charles Rauber
Frank Raymond
Simon Roberts
Pat Robertson
Alan Sinclair
Peter V. Smith
Nicola Stevens
Bill Stranger
Joe Strong
Charlie Tough
Bernie Trafford
Robert Walls
Bill Wells
Robert White
Billy Wilson
Vern Wright

Other sports
David Cunningham - ice hockey player
Sam Greco - martial artist
Paul Hibbert - cricketer
Bob Jane - race car driver and businessman
Frank LoPorto - boxer
Ian Lee - cricketer
Terry MacGill - cricketer
Luke McFadyen - rugby union player
Richard Newman - cricketer
Mickey Roche - cricketer
Tarık Solak - kickboxing promoter
Peter Thomson - golfer
Henry Walkerden - cricketer

Politics and judiciary
Frederick Oswald Barnett - social reformer
Ruth Hope Crow - political activist
John Curtin - 14th Prime Minister of Australia
Lily D'Ambrosio - politician
Harold Daffen - politician
Frederic Eggleston - politician and lawyer
Mohammed El-Leissy - politician and comedian
William Folster - politician
Bob Gray - politician
Frederick Hickford - politician
Maurice Kennedy - politician and trade unionist
Cyril Isaac - politician
Bill Kelty - trade unionist
Bert Kyle - New Zealand politician
Edward Meagher - politician
Eddie Micallef - politician
 Leonard Edward Bishop Stretton (1893–1967) – judge and royal commissioner.

Music, arts and entertainment
Sam Atyeo - painter and diplomat
 Charles William Bush (1919–1989) – artist
Arthur Butchers - New Zealand historian
Mae Dahlberg - actress
Leonard French - artist
Rosalie Ham - author
Sarah Howell - cartoonist
The Hawking Brothers - musicians
Shane Maloney - artist 
Aamer Rahman - comedian
Eric Smith - artist
Katy Steele - musician
Charles Richard Wilton - journalist

Criminals
Lewis Caine - criminal
Christopher Dale Flannery - criminal
Tony Mokbel - criminal

Other
Henry Garnet Forrest - flying ace
Anne Syrett Green - welfare worker and evangelist
Solomon Lew - businessman
Coralie Ling - Christian Minister
Shane Mackinlay - Catholic bishop
Albert H. Maggs - bookmaker
Sally Norton - plant scientist
Andrew Wilkie - zoo director
Harry Winbush - architect

References

Melbourne-related lists
Lists of people from Victoria (Australia)